

Medals

Lebanese medals by sport

Lebanese Medal winners

Medalists

References

note: the following link's medal table puts leb with only one bronze, while the text within, gives lebanon 1 silver and 2 bronzes

https://web.archive.org/web/20140623153535/http://www.cijm.org.gr/images/stories/pdf/JM1967.pdf

Nations at the 1967 Mediterranean Games
Lebanon at the Mediterranean Games
1967 in Lebanese sport